The World Has Made Me the Man of My Dreams is the seventh studio album by the American musician Meshell Ndegeocello. The album was released in August 2007. Five of the tracks were previously released on Meshell's 2006 EP, The Article 3.

In the U.S, The World Has Made Me The Man Of My Dreams peaked at #186 on the Billboard 200 Albums chart and #60 on Billboard's Top R&B Album chart.

Track listing
"Haditha"
"The Sloganeer: Paradise"
"Evolution"
"Virgo"
"Lovely Lovely"
"Elliptical"
"Shirk"
"Article 3"
"Michelle Johnson"
"Headline"
"Solomon"
"Relief: A Stripper Classic

Personnel
Meshell Ndegeocello – bass, vocals
Brandon Ross – guitar
Mike Severson – guitar
David Gilmore – guitar
Doyle Bramhall II – guitar
Hervé Sambe – guitar
Rhamis Kent – guitar
Pat Metheny – guitar
Scott Mann – guitar, keyboards
Daniel Jones – keyboards
Jason Lindner – keyboards
Daniel Jones – vocals, synthesizer
Robert Glasper – piano
Mark Kelley – bass
Hamza Yusuf – voice
Jack Bean – voice
Sy Smith – vocals
Oumou Sangare – vocals
Thandiswa Mazwai – vocals
Deantoni Parks – drums
James Newton – flute
Oliver Lake – saxophone
George McMullen – trombone
Graham Haynes – cornet
Gilmar Gomes – percussion
Davi Vieira – percussion
Chad Royce – percussion
Rhamis Kent – drums

References

External links

2007 albums
Meshell Ndegeocello albums